Sainte-Cécile-du-Cayrou (Languedocien: Santa Ceselha del Cairon) is a commune in the Tarn department in southern France.

Geography
The Vère forms part of the commune's southern border.

See also
Communes of the Tarn department

References

Communes of Tarn (department)